Knightswood is a suburban district in Glasgow.

Knightswood may also refer to:

Places
Republic of Ireland
Knightswood, County Westmeath, a townland in Leny civil parish, barony of Corkaree, County Westmeath

See also
Knightswood Secondary School
Knightswood St Margaret's Parish Church